Hamed Modibo Diallo (born December 18, 1976) is an Ivorian former professional footballer who played as a forward.

Career

Professional
Born in Zahia, Ivory Coast, Diallo began his career in France, initially in the youth academy of Le Havre, and later playing for Laval, Amiens, Angers, as well as with Al Rayyan in Qatar, Hammarby in Sweden, Turris in Italy, and Excelsior Virton in Belgium. He was the top scorer in the French Ligue 2 twice: in 1999 with Laval, and in 2002 with Amiens.

Diallo came to the United States in 2007 to play for Rochester Raging Rhinos in the USL First Division. During the 2007 season with Rochester, Diallo was a regular starter up front along with English-born striker Matthew Delicate; however, during 2008 Diallo gradually became a less frequent member of new coach Darren Tilley's squad, and had only eventually logged 474 minutes of playing time in 13 USL matches during the 2008 season.

On July 9, 2008, Diallo was transferred to Carolina RailHawks in return for Jamil Walker. Diallo produced a top-notch season with RailHawks in his debut season, where he recorded a hat-trick against the Seattle Sounders despite losing the match on a score of 4–3. He finished off the season by scoring seven goals and registering three assists in 16 games to finish with a team-leading 17 points. Despite a promising debut season, Diallo unfortunately failed to regain his previous form that dominated the 2008 season; which led to limited playing time during the 2009 season. On March 8, 2010 the Real Maryland Monarchs announced the signing of Diallo to a contract for the 2010 season.

International
Diallo played for the Ivory Coast national football team at the 2000 African Cup of Nations.

Honours
 Ligue 2 top scorer: 1999 with 20 goals, 2002 with 18 goals

References

External links
Carolina RailHawks bio
Rochester Rhinos bio

1976 births
Living people
People from Sassandra-Marahoué District
Ivorian footballers
Ivorian expatriate footballers
Ivory Coast international footballers
Association football forwards
Le Havre AC players
Stade Lavallois players
Amiens SC players
Al-Rayyan SC players
Angers SCO players
Hammarby Fotboll players
S.S. Turris Calcio players
R.E. Virton players
Rochester New York FC players
North Carolina FC players
Real Maryland F.C. players
Ligue 1 players
Ligue 2 players
Qatar Stars League players
USL First Division players
USL Second Division players
Ivorian expatriate sportspeople in France
Ivorian expatriate sportspeople in Qatar
Ivorian expatriate sportspeople in Italy
Ivorian expatriate sportspeople in Belgium
Ivorian expatriate sportspeople in the United States
Expatriate footballers in France
Expatriate footballers in Qatar
Expatriate footballers in Sweden
Expatriate footballers in Italy
Expatriate footballers in Belgium
Expatriate soccer players in the United States
2000 African Cup of Nations players